Kashkarov is a Russian masculine surname, its feminine counterpart is Kashkarova. Notable people with the surname include:

Igor Kashkarov (born 1933), Russian high jumper
Juri Kashkarov (born 1963), Russian biathlete

Russian-language surnames